Ignaz Stanislaus Sowinski (1858–1917) was a Polish architect and journalist who was active in Galicia from the middle of the 1880s and until the outbreak of World War I.

Life 

Sowinski was born  in Kraków, Galicia, in what was then Austrian Poland.

From around 1881, he was active as a freelance architect in Vienna where he opened his own studio and occasionally also worked as a journalist.

His spectrum ranged from rental houses and villas to factories. One of his most spectacular commissions was the construction of the Wilhelminenberg Castle in Vienna (1903/08). He was also active in other regions of the Habsburg monarchy, especially in his native Kraków. From September 1913, he took part in the restoration work of the Wawel Castle in Kraków and was appointed head of the company in July 1914. After the outbreak of World War I in the autumn of that year, he left Kraków again and returned to Vienna. After some of his designs had been rejected by the renovation committee, he put off his assignment in February 1916. A little over a year later, he died at Kraków and was buried in the Rakowicki Cemetery.

Personal life 

In 1889 he married Barbara Pammer (1860-1901). They had no children.

References

See also 

Lutheran City Church

1858 births
1917 deaths
Architects from Kraków
Architects from Vienna
Journalists from Kraków
Journalists from Vienna
TU Wien alumni